Historic England (officially the Historic Buildings and Monuments Commission for England) is an executive non-departmental public body of the British Government sponsored by the Department for Culture, Media and Sport. It is tasked with protecting the historic environment of England by preserving and listing historic buildings, scheduling ancient monuments, registering historic parks and gardens and by advising central and local government.

The body was officially created by the National Heritage Act 1983, and operated from April 1984 to April 2015 under the name of English Heritage. In 2015, following the changes to English Heritage's structure that moved the protection of the National Heritage Collection into the voluntary sector in the English Heritage Trust; the body that remained was rebranded as Historic England.

The body also inherited the Historic England Archive from the old English Heritage, and projects linked to the archive such as Britain from Above, which saw the archive work with the Royal Commission on the Ancient and Historical Monuments of Wales and the Royal Commission on the Ancient and Historical Monuments of Scotland to digitise, catalogue and put online 96,000 of the oldest Aerofilms images. The archive also houses various national collections, including the results of older projects, such as the Royal Commission on the Historical Monuments of England and Images of England (providing online access to images of listed buildings in England as of 2002).

Remit

Historic England inherited English Heritage's position as the UK government's statutory adviser and a statutory consultee on all aspects of the historic environment and its heritage assets. This includes archaeology on land and underwater, historic buildings sites and areas, designated landscapes and the historic elements of the wider landscape. It monitors and reports on the state of England's heritage and publishes the annual Heritage at Risk survey which is one of the UK government's official statistics. It is tasked to secure the preservation and enhancement of the man-made heritage of England for the benefit of future generations.

Its remit involves:
 Caring for nationally important archive collections of photographs, drawings and other records which document the historic environment of England and date from the eighteenth century onwards.
 Giving grants to national and local organisations for the conservation of historic buildings, monuments and landscapes. In 2013/14 over £13 million worth of grants were made to support heritage buildings.
 Advising central UK government on which English heritage assets are nationally important and should be protected by designation (i.e. listing, scheduling, etc.).
 Administering and maintaining the register of England's listed buildings, scheduled monuments, registered battlefields, World Heritage Sites and protected parks and gardens. This is published online as the National Heritage List for England.
 Advising local authorities on managing changes to the most important parts of heritage.
 Providing expertise through advice, training and guidance to improve the standards and skills of people working in heritage, practical conservation and access to resources. In 2009–2010 it trained around 200 professionals working in local authorities and the wider sector.
 Consulting and collaborating with other heritage bodies, local and national planning organisations e.g. the preparation of the 2010 Planning Policy statement for the Historic Environment (PPS5).
 Commissioning and conducting archaeological research, including the publication of Heritage Counts and Heritage at Risk on behalf of the heritage sector; these are annual research surveys into the state of England's heritage.

It is not responsible for approving alterations to listed buildings. The management of listed buildings is the responsibility of local planning authorities and the Department for Communities and Local Government.

Historic England also owns the National Heritage Collection of nationally important historic sites, currently in public care. However, it does not run these sites as this function is instead carried out by the English Heritage Trust under licence until 2023.

See also
 
 
 
 
 
 
 
 
 
 
 Lists
 List of Conservation topics
 List of heritage registers
 List of country houses in the United Kingdom
 List of museums in England

References

External links

The Historic England Archive: Search over 1 million catalogue entries describing photographs, plans and drawings of England's buildings and historic sites, held in the Historic England Archive.
Britain from Above : presents the unique Aerofilms collection of aerial photographs from 1919-1953. 
National Heritage List for England website

 
Heritage organisations in England
Heritage registers in England
British architectural history
Conservation in England
.
Historic sites in England
Interested parties in planning in England
England, Historic
National heritage organizations
Department for Digital, Culture, Media and Sport
Non-departmental public bodies of the United Kingdom government
Government agencies established in 2015
2015 establishments in England
Research organisations in England